The 2021 Bowburn crash occurred on the A1(M) near Bowburn in County Durham on 15 July 2021. A lorry carrying fertiliser crashed into stationary traffic, killing three people; its driver was distracted by browsing dating sites, and was convicted of causing death by dangerous driving.

Incident 
On 15 July 2021, at 18:15 BST, traffic on the A1(M) near Bowburn had been stopped by spilled brake fluid. Onut's lorry travelled  after the initial impact, onto the central reservation, before coming to a stop. Onut had been browsing dating sites on his mobile phone for over 40 minutes while at the wheel, driving distracted and causing him to ignore the hazard.

Three people were killed in the collision and fire: David Daglish, Paul Mullen and Elaine Sullivan. Several others were injured, three of them seriously. Two of the fatalities were so badly burnt that they could not be immediately identified; police were able to learn their identities from their pet's microchip. One of the injured was Molly Smith, who had suffered a head injury and was taken to hospital. She was 26 weeks pregnant at the time, but the baby was left unharmed. Michael Hosty and Ryan Campbell rushed into the fire to rescue Onut from his burning lorry, and were commended in court for their bravery. Onut was arrested at the scene.

Conviction 
Onut admitted three counts of causing death by dangerous driving and was jailed for eight years and ten months. He was also disqualified from driving for fourteen years and five months. The sentence was examined by the Attorney General and found not to be so unduly lenient as to be referred to the Court of Appeal under the unduly lenient sentence scheme.

References 

2021 crimes in the United Kingdom
2021 in England
July 2021 events in the United Kingdom
Road incidents in England
2021 road incidents in Europe
2020s in County Durham
Transport in County Durham
A1 road (Great Britain)
Driver distraction
Vehicle fires
2021 fires in the United Kingdom
Fires in England